Phyllogonostreptus nigrolabiatus is a common species of millipede found in India, and Sri Lanka.

References

External links
Muscular anatomy of the millipede Phyllogonostreptus nigrolabiatus (Diplopoda: Spirostreptida) and its bearing on the millipede "thorax".
Cytology and Cytochemistry of Spermatogenesis in Two Millipedes Phyllogonostreptus nigrolabiatus and Gonoplectus malayus
Some observations on the millipede, Phyllogonostreptus nigrolabiatus (Newport 1844) (Diplopoda, Myriapoda), from Poona  [1969]
Studies On Reproduction And Neurosecretion In The Millipede Phyllogonostreptus Nigrolabiatus
Host Preference by Millipede Phyllogonostreptus nigrolabiatus (Newport) (Harpagophoridae ; Spirostreptida)
Changes in the haemolymph proteins of the millipede, Phyllogonostreptus nigrolabiatus during ovarian development

Spirostreptida
Arthropods of India
Animals described in 1844